Thomas "Tom" William Courtney (born August 17, 1933) is a retired American athlete, winner of two gold medals in the 1956 Olympic Games

Tom Courtney came into national prominence while a student at Fordham University, winning the 1955 NCAA 880 yd (805 m) title.

An AAU champion in 400 m at 1956 and in 880 yd (805 m) at 1957 and 1958, Courtney had a memorable duel with Derek Johnson of Great Britain in the 1956 Olympic 800 m final. Johnson took a narrow lead with 40 meters to go, but finally Courtney won by 0.13 seconds, and collapsed with exhaustion.  He later wrote:

 "It was a new kind of agony for me. My head was exploding, my stomach ripping and even the tips of my fingers ached. The only thing I could think was, 'If I live, I will never run again.'"

The medal ceremony had to be delayed for an hour while he and Johnson recovered. But Courtney did run again. He was the anchorman on the gold medal 4 × 400 m relay team. He also set a world record of 1:46.8 in the 880 yd (805 m) on May 24, 1957.

Courtney received a bachelor's degree from Fordham University in 1955, and since 1994, the (autographed) varsity jacket from his college track days hangs in a display case along with similar memorabilia from other great Fordham athletes, such as Vince Lombardi.

Courtney's victory was the last in a series of four straight 800 meter gold medals by the US and the seventh overall to that point in time.  He could be considered the end of the dynasty.  Since then, the USA has only had one other male winner, Dave Wottle in 1972 and have only won four bronze medals.

He would later earn his MBA from Harvard Business School.

References

USATF Hall of Fame Bio

1933 births
Living people
Track and field athletes from Newark, New Jersey
American male sprinters
American male middle-distance runners
Athletes (track and field) at the 1956 Summer Olympics
Fordham Rams men's track and field athletes
Olympic gold medalists for the United States in track and field
Medalists at the 1956 Summer Olympics
Harvard Business School alumni
20th-century American people